Yin Chang (born April 23, 1989) is an American actress, known for her lead role as Mei Kwan in the 2011 film Prom and her recurring role as Nelly Yuki on The CW's teen drama series Gossip Girl. Chang has made guest appearances on the television shows Six Degrees, Law & Order: Special Victims Unit, Law & Order: Criminal Intent, and Love Bites. Some of her other works are several national commercials such as Time Warner, Verizon Wireless, MasterCard, Best Buy, MTV, and Mead School Supplies.

Chang was born and raised in New York City, and is of Taiwanese, Chinese, and Malaysian Chinese ancestry. Her father is from Taiwan and her mother from Malaysia. Her maternal grandfather was artist Dr. Teng Beng Chew.

Filmography

Film

Television

References

External links

 

21st-century American actresses
Actresses from New York City
American actresses of Chinese descent
American actresses of Taiwanese descent
American film actresses
American people of Malaysian descent
American television actresses
Living people
1989 births